Miki Janković (born 26 September 1994) is a Serbian tennis coach and former professional tennis player. He participated as a doubles player in a Serbian squad that won 2012 World Team Cup.

In September 2017, due to recurring hip injuries, Janković decided to retire as a professional player and start a coaching career.

Team competition finals: 1 (1–0)

References

External links

1994 births
Living people
Tennis players from Belgrade
Serbian male tennis players
Serbian tennis coaches
21st-century Serbian people